Porphyrosela teramni is a moth of the family Gracillariidae. It is known from South Africa and Zimbabwe.

The length of the forewings is 2.09–2.18 mm. The forewing ground colour is golden ochreous. The hindwings are light fuscous. Adults are on wing from early November to mid-May.

The larvae feed on Teramnus species (including Teramnus labialis) and Vigna species (including Vigna luteola). They mine the leaves of their host plant. The mine has the form of a moderate, oblong, transparent, tentiform mine on underside of leaf.

References

Moths described in 1961
Lithocolletinae
Lepidoptera of South Africa
Lepidoptera of Zimbabwe
Moths of Sub-Saharan Africa